The Oberon System is a modular, single-user, single-process, multitasking operating system written in the programming language Oberon. It was originally developed in the late 1980s at ETH Zurich. The Oberon System has an unconventional visual text user interface (TUI) instead of a conventional command-line interface (CLI) or graphical user interface (GUI). This TUI was very innovative in its time and influenced the design of the Acme text editor for the Plan 9 from Bell Labs operating system.

The latest version of the Oberon System, Project Oberon 2013, is still maintained by Niklaus Wirth and several collaborators, but older ETH versions of the system have been orphaned. The system also evolved into the multi-process, symmetric multiprocessing (SMP) capable A2 (formerly Active Object System (AOS), then Bluebottle), with a zooming user interface (ZUI).

History 
The Oberon operating system was originally developed as part of the NS32032-based Ceres workstation project. It was written almost entirely (and in  the 2013 version entirely is valid) in the Oberon programming language. 
The basic system was designed and implemented by Niklaus Wirth and Jürg Gutknecht and its design and implementation is fully documented in their book "Project Oberon". The user Interface and programmers reference is found in Martin Reiser's book "The Oberon System". The Oberon System was later extended and ported to other hardware platforms
by a team at ETH Zurich and there was recognition in popular magazines.
 
Wirth and Gutknecht (although being active computer science professors) refer to themselves as 'part-time programmers' in the book Project Oberon. In late 2013, a few months before his 80th birthday, Wirth published a second edition of Project Oberon. It details implementing the Oberon System using a reduced instruction set computer (RISC) CPU of his own design realized on a Xilinx field-programmable gate array (FPGA) board. It was presented at the symposium organized for his 80th birthday at ETH Zurich. In the meantime, several emulators for this version were implemented.

According to Josef Templ, a former member of the developer group at Swiss Federal Institute of Technology in Zurich and later member of the Institut für Systemsoftware of Johannes Kepler University Linz, where one forked version (V4) was maintained, the genealogy of the different versions of the Oberon System is this:

User interface 
Oberon has a text user interface (TUI), which is very different from a terminal user interface. It combines the point and click convenience of a graphical user interface (GUI) with the linguistic strength of a command-line interface (CLI) and is closely tied to the naming conventions of the Oberon language. Text appearing almost anywhere on a screen can be edited and used as command input. Commands are activated by a middle-mouse click on a text fragment of the form Module.Command (optionally followed by parameters, which are terminated by ~). A command is defined by any procedure which is exported and has an empty argument list. Parameters to the command must be defined before executing the middle click, and must be explicitly scanned and retrieved by the procedure. No checks or questions occur during command execution. This is sometimes called a non-modal user interface (UI). Nothing like a command prompt is needed.

Although very different from a command line, the TUI is very efficient and powerful. A steep ascent in the early learning curve makes it a bit difficult at first. No questions are asked: this is a deliberate design decision, which needs getting used to. Most editors ask the user when closing a modified text: this is not the case in the Oberon System. The use of the TUI and programming interface is fully documented in Martin Reiser's book "The Oberon System". A short introduction to the user interface can be found on Niklaus Wirth's home page. The later Versions of System Oberon, Oberon V4 (V4, sometimes also named Linz-Oberon) and Oberon System 3 (or S3, sometimes also named ETH-Oberon or Spirit of Oberon), enhanced the basic interface with different but incompatible implementations for buttons, drop down menus, and other active elements. V4 used for that purpose a dedicated control character embedded in normal text in contrast to System 3, which extended the kernel by introducing persistent objects. Both extensions include a large set of user interface elements.

Mastering the Oberon user interface, both the purely textual and the so-called Gadgets System (under S3), is non-trivial. Thus, after successfully installing Oberon System 3, it is recommended to study André Fischers Oberon System 3 Tutorial. An expanded version of this tutorial was published as a book, which it is out of print now. The whole book is available in electronic form under a one user license in every installed version of System 3 (Windows, Linux, or Native, i.e., also with the Gadgets toolkit of OLR). More information how to get your own copy of the Oberon Companion may be found in the Getting Started section of the Oberon Wikibook.

Similar user Interfaces have yet to appear in more commonplace operating systems. Rob Pike's Acme system for Plan 9 from Bell Labs was strongly inspired by the Oberon TUI. Whether the worksheet interface of the Macintosh Programmer's Workshop influenced Oberon's TUI or vice versa is difficult to decide: the Oberon System was based on Wirth's prior computer design the Lilith, and both the Apple Macintosh (and its precursor Lisa) and the Oberon System (on Ceres and its precursor Lilith) have the same roots: they were all inspired by the Alto developed at Xerox PARC.

Versions and availability 
V1 was the first usable version some time before the Oberon Trilogy was published. A major change in the text model together with the editor named Write yielded V2. As foreshadowed in the table in section History above, there was a major fork in the early 1990s: V4 vs. System 3: The group around Jürg Gutknecht introduced persistent objects and object-libraries thereby extending the kernel. The group around Hanspeter Mössenböck realized similar features by introducing active elements mapped to a special character thereby extending fonts without changing the kernel. System 3 was sometimes also named Spirit of Oberon and later renamed ETH Oberon, whereas V4 was sometimes also named Linz Oberon.

 As of 2017, the Oberon OS is available for several hardware computing platforms, generally in no cost versions and from several sources, which is quite confusing. The Oberon OS is typically extremely compact. Even with an Oberon compiler, assorted utilities including a web browser, TCP/IP networking, and a GUI, the full package can be compressed to one 3.5" floppy disk. There are versions which emulated the Oberon OS on another operating system and versions which run on bare hardware. The latter ones are named Native Oberon. There are native versions for the Ceres, Intel IA-32, and ARM platforms. In 2013, Niklaus Wirth adapted the basic system as described in "Project Oberon" to a current FPGA design. According to the preface of the 2013 edition, the whole system compiles in less than 10 seconds on a Spartan-3 board. This version is sometimes also named V5, despite it being much more similar functionally to the original V1 running on the Ceres than any of the later versions.

Plugin Oberon and slim binaries
A version of the Oberon System 3, which is more integrated in the Microsoft Windows OS than other implementations was named Plugin Oberon. Plugin Oberon had support for OLE, Netscape Plugins, and the binary format named Oberon Module Interchange (OMI) or slim binaries, which allowed portable object code between Intel x86, Motorola 68K, and PowerPC architectures. Slim binaries were invented by Michael Franz in the early 1990s. They were motivated and opposed to the fat binaries invented by Apple during the transition from 68k to PowerPC architectures. OMI provided portable code based on a compressed version of the abstract syntax tree. The approach of a compressed abstract syntax tree for portable code representation is revived in the Java world for GraalVM and Truffle.

Oberon V4
The version named Oberon V4 (see also History) is closer to the original operating system developed by Wirth and Gutknecht. It was originally developed at ETHZ, but when H.P. Mössenböck went to Institut für Systemsoftware at Johannes-Kepler University in Linz (JKU), the development of V4 moved also. Thus, V4 is sometimes also called Linz-Oberon in contrast to ETH-Oberon. The most recent version of V4 and extensions are available at JKU. Oberon V4 appears to be orphaned, there are almost no changes since 2000. Another repository of V4 is Claudio Nieder's Oberon V4, which also shows difference between the different V4 implementations. Since 2013 this page moved to/is mirrored at SourceForge. V4 is closer to what would now be called an integrated development environment than an operating system of its own. There were many extensions written for V4, which are still available from the ftp server of SSW at JKU; some documentation can be found on their web-pages, more information is normally included in the packages and it is given in Oberon's special rich text format.

AOS/Bluebottle/A2
Around 2010, the computer science department at ETH Zurich began exploring active objects and concurrency for operating systems, and has released an early version of a new language Active Oberon and a new operating system for it, first named Active Object System (AOS) in 2002, then due to trademark issues, renamed Bluebottle in 2005, then renamed A2 in 2008. It is available from ETH Zurich with most source via the Internet. Native versions (A2) run on bare hardware, and are currently possible for Intel IA-32 and x86-64 single- and multi-processor systems, and for the StrongARM CPU family. Versions for other operating systems are available on Windows (WinAos), Unix (UnixAos), Linux (LinuxAos), and macOS (DarwinAos). More detailed information about A2 is on the Russian Wikipedia pages about A2.

stailaOS
As a part of an industrial research project the Native Systems Group of ETH Zurich has developed an application-specific operating system named stailaOS which is based on the latest version Oberon OS. It is intended for uses such as real-time analytics, high performance automated trading system (ATS), main memory based enterprise resource planning (ERP), etc.

Native Oberon

Native Oberon is an Oberon System that runs on bare hardware. PC-Native Oberon is a version that runs on IA-32 (x86-32) PC hardware. There has never been a V4 Native Oberon, so all information in this section implicitly assumes that it is System 3. Native Oberon has small hardware requirements: 133 MHz Pentium, 100MB hard disk, VESA 2 graphics card with resolution minimum of 1024x768 pixels, optional 3Com network card. The basic system runs from one HD floppy disk, and more software can be installed through a network. The full installation includes the Gadgets GUI. It is written fully in the language Oberon. The latest available version was 2.3.7. It is dated 5. January 2003 and sometimes also labeled as Update/Alpha, especially on the ftp-server of ETHZ. Later versions were incorporated in AOS/BlueBottle/A2.

LNO
A version named Linux Native Oberon (LNO) uses Linux as a hardware abstraction layer (HAL). Its goal is to be as compatible as possible to PC-Native Oberon. Other versions of the Oberon System, without Native in the name, had partly modified interfaces of low level modules. In 2015, Peter Matthias revitalized LNO under the name Oberon Linux Revival (OLR) as a multi-platform distribution running seamlessly on Intel x86, ARM, MIPS, and RISC-V. It runs well on the Raspberry Pi and on the low cost CHIP computer; with some tweaking (adjusting group membership or/and permissions on some devices) it runs well on Tiny Core Linux. OLR interfaces with Linux kernel by direct system calls. , OLR lacks a network layer.

Project Oberon 2013
In 2013, Wirth and Paul Reed completed a re-implementation of the original Oberon System for the Digilent Xilinx Spartan 3 FPGA Starter Board. The work includes a revision of "Project Oberon", identified as Project Oberon (New Edition 2013). In 2015, Reed collaborated with Victor Yurkovsky to create OberonStation, a Xilinx Spartan 3-based computer designed specifically to run Oberon. The system has since been ported to a Xilinx Spartan 6 FPGA Pepino development board by Saanlima Electronics, and a Xilinx Artix 7-based Digilent Nexys A7-100 FPGA Trainer board by CFB Software. Peter de Wachter implemented an emulator for it, which was also ported to Java and JavaScript by Michael Schierl, running in modern browsers, and ported to Free Pascal/Ultibo by Markus Greim and to Go. Andreas Pirklbauer maintains an experimental version and extensions of Project Oberon 2013 at GitHub.

Gallery

Glossary 
A2 – Formerly Active Object System (AOS) in 2002, renamed Bluebottle in 2005 due to rumored copyright issues, renamed A2 in 2008.
ALO – ARM Linux Oberon; in LNO family and for ARM CPU.
AOS – see A2 entry above.
BB – BlackBox Component Builder. Component Pascal IDE from Oberon Microsystems.
Bluebottle – see A2 entry above.
CP – Component Pascal. A dialect in the Oberon family most similar to Oberon-2.
ETHO – Oberon as developed at Swiss Federal Institute of Technology in Zurich: Eidgenössische Technische Hochschule (ETH).
Fox – The compiler for Active Oberon, appearing in AOS (see A2 entry above).
LEO – Linux ETH Oberon. ETHO 2.4.3 for Linux x86.
LNO – Linux Native Oberon.
NO – Native Oberon. Runs on bare hardware rather than on another operating system.
OLR – Oberon Linux Revival. A version of NO which uses Linux as a HAL and runs on x86, ARM, and MIPS.
OP2 – The Portable Oberon-2 Compiler. OP2 was developed to port Oberon onto commercially available platforms.
PACO – (scope) PArallel COmpiler. Appears in A2 (see entry above). Compiles each scope in an independent thread.
RISC5 – the central processing unit (CPU) of Project Oberon 2013 based on Wirth's RISC architecture. Not to be confused with RISC-V.
UnixAOS – Unix-based AOS, see A2 entry above.
WinAOS – Windows-based AOS, see A2 entry above.

See also
 A2 (operating system)
 Oberon (programming language)
 Oberon-2 programming language

References

External links

 , old ETH Oberon homepage, dead since Jan-2020, redirect to Archive.org: archived version
 Oberon article on WikiWikiWeb
 Genealogy and History of the Oberon System version at archive.org 
 Oberon Bibliography

 Oberon compilers.
 Install ETH Oberon using QEMU
 BlueBottle/AOS/A2 An evolution of Native Oberon with support for Multiprocessor systems with Active Objects (kind of threads running on separate processors, if available) and a zooming user interface available  at ETH Zurich's redmine instance.
 Native Oberon Home Page redirected to Archive.org (May 2016 - this site has broken URLs in the links to the ftp-Server; files were moved from ftp://ftp.inf.ethz.ch/pub/ETHOberon/ to ftp://ftp.ethoberon.ethz.ch/, on 10 March 2022 a mirror of that server is still available at GWDG)
 Native Oberon Hardware Compatibility redirected to archive.org
 ETH PC Native Oberon, Usage Notes
 Lukas Mathis' Blog about Oberon A nice trace back to the history of user interfaces and Oberon.
 Oberon V4 main page at Johannes Kepler University Linz 
 Oberon V4 Sources Collected sources for different V4 implementations at SourceForge and Oberon V4 for Linux, more information in the corresponding wiki.
 http://www.projectoberon.com/, Project Oberon.
 Experimental Oberon
 WinOberon aka Plugin Oberon Version 2.6 as provided by Emil Zeller to Alexander Illjin around 2010
 Oberon System 3 Tutorial by André Fischer (1997), archived version

Free software operating systems
Object-oriented operating systems
1987 software